Die Freunde von Salamanka D.326 is an 1815 singspiel in two acts by Franz Schubert to a libretto by Johann Mayrhofer.

The score, overture and eighteen numbers, is for three sopranos, three tenors, six basses, mixed choir and orchestra:
 Akt I
 Ouvertüre
 1. Introduktion: Die Sonne zieht in goldnen Strahlen
 2. Arie: Man ist so glücklich und so frei
 3. Quartett: Morgen, wenn des Hahnes Ruf erschallt
 4. Arie: Einsam schleich’ ich durch die Zimmer
 5. Terzett: Lebensmut und frische Kühlung weht mir aus dem trauten Wald
 6. Terzett: Freund, wie wird die Sache enden
 7. Finale I: Mild senkt sich der Abend nieder
 Akt II
 8. Introduktion: Laßt nur alles leichtfertige Wesen
 9. Lied: Guerillas zieht durch Feld und Wald
 10. Arie: Aus Blumen deuten die Damen gern
 11. Duett: Ein wackres Thier, das müßt ihr sagen
 12. Duett: Gelagert unter’m hellen Dach der Bäume
 13. Arie: Wo ich weile, wo ich gehe
 14. Duett: Von tausend Schlangenbissen
 15. Romanze: Es murmeln die Quellen
 16. Terzett: Nichte, Don Diego da, wirbt um deine freie Hand
 17. Arie: Traurig geht der Geliebte von dannen
 18. Finale II: Gnäd’ge Frau, ich hab’ die Ehre

Recordings
Die Freunde von Salamanka, with fragments of Der Spiegelritter, featuring Edith Mathis, Edda Moser, Hermann Prey, Simeon ten Holt and Theodor Guschlbauer, Deutsche Grammophon 2LP 1981 reissued without the Spiegelritter fragments on 1CD by Brilliant Classics.

References

1815 operas
German-language operas
Operas by Franz Schubert
Operas